Surfactant protein C (SP-C), is one of the pulmonary surfactant proteins. In humans this is encoded by the SFTPC gene.

It is a membrane protein.

Structure 

SFTPC is a 197-residue protein made up of two halves: a unique N-terminal propeptide domain and a C-terminal BRICHOS domain. The around 100-aa long propeptide domain actually contains not only the cleaved part, but also the mature peptide. It can be further broken down into a 23-aa helical transmembrane propeptide proper, the mature secreted SP-C (24-58), and a linker (59-89) that connects to the BRICHOS domain.

The propeptide of pulmonary surfactant C has an N-terminal alpha-helical segment whose suggested function was stabilization of the protein structure, since the mature peptide can irreversibly transform from its native alpha-helical structure to beta-sheet aggregates and form amyloid fibrils. The correct intracellular trafficking of proSP-C has also been reported to depend on the propeptide.

The structure of the BRICHOS domain has been solved. Mutations in this domain also lead to amyloid fibrils made up of the mature peptide, suggesting a chaperone activity.

Clinical significance
Mutations are associated with surfactant metabolism dysfunction type 2.

Humans and animals born lacking SP-C tend to develop progressive interstitial lung disease.

Recombinant SP-C is used in Venticute, an artificial lung surfactant.

A process to mass-produce an analogue called rSP-C33Le by fusion with spidroin has been described.

References

Further reading

External links 
  GeneReviews/NIH/NCBI/UW entry on Pulmonary Fibrosis, Familial
 

Protein domains